Lock step refers to any of several dance steps that involves the "locking" of the moving foot:  the moving foot approaches to the standing foot, crosses in front of or behind it in the direction of the approach, stops close to the standing foot, and the weight is fully transferred to the (previously) moving foot.

The closeness of the feet so that the lower legs of the dancer are "locked" together crossed is the main difference from other cross-steps used, e.g., in the grapevine, where the moving (crossing)  foot travels away from the standing foot and the lower legs are separated. In the whisk the crossing foot travels around the standing foot, rather than "locks" from the direction of approach.

The term "lock step" or simply "lock" may be applied either to a single "locking" step or to a whole step pattern, e.g., of three steps, such as "step diagonally forward, lock behind, step diagonally forward". The footwork varies depending on the actual dance figure.

Lock steps are popular in the quickstep.

Ballroom dance figures
There are several dance figures with names involving the words "lock" or "lock step", as well as several figures that use the lock as part of the pattern.
Back lock
Forward lock
Turning lock
Curving lock
Skip lock
Syncopated lock (single or double)
Samba locks
Cruzados locks
The Six Quick Lock
Double lock
Forward checked lock
Reverse turns in Viennese waltz
Fishtail
In cha-cha-cha, advanced variations of basic figures  may involve replacement of the cha-cha-cha chassés with lock steps.
Some triple steps in West Coast Swing may be stylized into lock-steps.

References

External links
 
 

Social dance steps